The 2017 Okayama GT 300km was the first round of the 2017 Super GT Series. It was held at the Okayama International Circuit in Mimasaka, Okayama Prefecture, Japan. Ryō Hirakawa and Nick Cassidy won the GT500 category whilst Nobuteru Taniguchi and Tatsuya Kataoka won the GT300 category.

Race Report

Qualifying 
The #8 Autobacs Racing Team Aguri entry of Tomoki Nojiri and Takashi Kobayashi claimed pole position with the time of 1:20.604. The session itself was filled with attrition, with two red flags as well as varying weather conditions ultimately determining the final part of qualifying. Daisuke Nakajima's best time was erased due to causing a red flag, thereby dropping the #16 Team Mugen entry down to seventh. The other red flag was caused by Kazuki Nakajima, whose best time was also erased; dropping him to eighth.

In the GT300 category, the front-row was locked out by a pair of Mercedes-AMG GT3's, with the #65 K2 R&D LEON Racing entry of Naoya Gamou and Haruki Kurosawa claiming pole position and the #4 Goodsmile Racing & TeamUKYO taking out second.

GT500

GT300

Race 
In what was a dominant display by the Lexus brand, the opening round of the Super GT season was won by the Lexus Team KeePer Tom's duo of Ryō Hirakawa and Nick Cassidy. The start was delayed due to several vehicles stopping on the formation lap. One of these included the pole sitting car of Tomoki Nojiri and Takashi Kobayashi. The race was eventually started under safety car conditions. Wasting no time, Cassidy made a bold move down the inside of Kazuya Oshima, locking up both wheels in the process. Shortly thereafter, the #52 Saitama Toyopet Green Brave GT300 entry crashed, bringing out the safety car. After a round of pitstops, the #6 Lexus Team LeMans Wako's entry was catapulted into the lead. A long battle between Andrea Caldarelli and Ryō Hirakawa ensued, which ultimately saw the #37 Lexus Team KeePer Tom's entry emerge victorious.

In the GT300 category, Nobuteru Taniguchi and Tatsuya Kataoka took victory ahead of Haruki Kurosawa and Naoya Gamou, with both Mercedes maintaining the top two spots, albeit in reversed order.

References

Okayama